The following lists events that happened in 2008 in North Korea.

Census
The 2008 North Korea Census recorded the population of North Korea as 24,052,231 inhabitants (11,721,838 male and 12,330,393 female).

Incumbents
Premier: Kim Yong-il
Supreme Leader: Kim Jong-il

References

Further reading

 
North Korea
Years of the 21st century in North Korea
2000s in North Korea
North Korea